Van Vleck Independent School District is a public school district based in the community of Van Vleck in unincorporated Matagorda County, Texas (USA).  The Superintendent of Schools is John R. O'Brien.

The district serves the communities of Van Vleck, Allenhurst, Caney, Cedar Lake, Cedar Lane, Hawkinsville, and Sargent.

In 2009, the school district was rated "academically acceptable" by the Texas Education Agency.

Schools in the district  include:
Van Vleck High School
O.H. Herman Middle School
E. Rudd Intermediate School
Van Vleck Elementary School

References

External links
 

School districts in Matagorda County, Texas